Tachikawa is a Japanese surname. Notable people with the surname include:

Akira Tachikawa, Japanese opera singer
, Japanese businessman and president of the Japan Aerospace Exploration Agency
, Japanese footballer
, Japanese historian
, Japanese manga artist
, Japanese-American educator
, Japanese baseball player
, Japanese director

Fictional characters
, a character in the anime series Digimon Adventure

Japanese-language surnames